Phidiana lascrucensis is a species of sea slug, a nudibranch, a marine, gastropod mollusk in the family Facelinidae.

Distribution
This species was described from Bahia Las Cruces, Baja California del Sur, Mexico, . It has been reported from the central Gulf of California (Bahia Bacochibampo, Sonora, Mexico) south to the Golfo de Nicoya, Costa Rica.

References

Facelinidae
Gastropods described in 1928